Lars Strandqvist (born 4 April 1955) is a Swedish curler.

Teams

References

External links

Styrelse & kommittéer | Timrå GK
Team Sundsvall Curling Marklund  - Division 1 Norra 2017-2018 - Cuponline

Living people
1955 births
Swedish male curlers
European curling champions
Swedish curling champions
20th-century Swedish people